Scarpellini is a surname. Notable people with the surname include:

Caterina Scarpellini (1808–1873), Italian astronomer and meteorologist
Elena Scarpellini (born 1987), Italian pole vaulter
Eugenio Scarpellini (1954–2020), Italian-born Bolivian Roman Catholic bishop

Italian-language surnames